Mahoe is a common name for several plants and may refer to:
Alectryon macrococcus, or ʻalaʻalahua, a species of tree in the soapberry family endemic to Hawaii
Melicytus ramiflorus, a tree endemic to New Zealand
Other Melicytus trees in New Zealand
Talipariti elatum, or blue mahoe, a species of tree in the mallow family native to the Caribbean